Sir Michael Bowen Hanley KCB (24 February 1918 – 1 January 2001) was Director General (DG) of MI5, the United Kingdom's internal security service, from 1972 to 1978.

Career
Educated at Sedbergh School and Queen's College, Oxford where he read history, Hanley served during the Second World War, being commissioned into the Royal Artillery of the British Army on 28 December 1940. His service number was 164032. He was subsequently served as an assistant military attaché to the Joint Allied Intelligence Centre in Budapest from 1946 to 1948.

In 1948, Hanley joined the security service. He rose through the grades to be Deputy Director General of MI5, 1971–72. He was Director General of MI5 from 1972 to 1978.

As Director General, Hanley had a difficult relationship with the Prime Minister, Harold Wilson. Wilson wrongly suspected MI5 of plotting against him in a conspiracy known as 'The Wilson Plot'.

References

External links
Obituary at ''The Daily Telegraph
Obituary at The Guardian
British Army Officers 1939−1945

1918 births
2001 deaths
Alumni of The Queen's College, Oxford
Directors General of MI5
People educated at Sedbergh School
Knights Commander of the Order of the Bath
British Army personnel of World War II
British intelligence operatives
Royal Artillery soldiers
Military personnel from Leeds